VinaMazda is a Vietnamese joint-venture automotive company jointly operated by Mazda and THACO. In late 2010, Mazda's return to Vietnam was announced. A 10000-vehicle-per-year factory was inaugurated in 2011 in Núi Thành District. The company manufactures for domestic Vietnamese motorists such models as the Mazda BT-50 and Mazda CX-5.

References

External link 
 

Car manufacturers of Vietnam